Today with Des and Mel was a British television chat show hosted by Des O'Connor (Des O'Connor Tonight) and Melanie Sykes. The show featured celebrity guests, phone-in competitions and chat between the hosts.  It was produced by Carlton Television, at The London Studios. The show was previously produced at Teddington Studios for the first series.

Today with Des and Mel was loosely based on the format of the popular American television show, Live with Regis and Kelly.

Although the filming pattern varied, for much of the show's run, Monday's, Tuesday's, and Wednesday's programmes were recorded 'as live' very shortly before start of transmission (typically being recorded about half an hour prior), while Thursday's and Friday's episodes were pre-recorded in a separate block on Wednesdays.

The series pulled in extremely high ratings for its daytime slot, and as a result at one stage, the show was given the 
green light for an evening version to be made. For a brief time in early 2005, the show appeared in a 5 p.m. slot, but this was soon dropped, and a full prime-time version never came about.

ITV announced on 12 May 2006, that the show had been axed.

Guest presenters
Paul O'Grady was a regular guest presenter, with ITV bosses being so impressed with his performance, that they gave him his own show - The Paul O'Grady Show (the show later moved to Channel 4 from 2006 to 2009 before returning to ITV in 2013). Dale Winton, Bradley Walsh and Richard Whiteley also covered for Des on occasion. Jenny Powell – who contributed a regular Friday feature describing various tasks for the show that she had undertaken that week, which was dropped a while into the show's run – occasionally covered for Mel.

On 3 November 2008 and Wednesday 8 April 2009, both Des and Mel filled in as guest hosts on 'The Paul O'Grady Show whilst Paul had time off. O'Grady had requested their use in this capacity as he felt indebted to the pair for playing a role in him being awarded his own show.

2002 British television series debuts
2006 British television series endings
Carlton Television
English-language television shows
Television series by ITV Studios
Television shows produced by Granada Television
Television shows shot at Teddington Studios